Milk Inc. is a dance music group that formed in the commercial dance scene in Belgium in 1995. The discography of the group includes a total of seven studio albums and 41 singles.

History 
Milk Inc. released their first hit single "La Vache" in April 1997. Milk Inc. have had several tours throughout Europe. Their music is characterized by a specific emotional mood, which is created through the use of appropriate synthesizers. In its early days as Milk Inc., the band had also had a guitarist and harpist, John Miles Jr., which is an unusual instrument to be used in dance music.

The band has had many line-up changes throughout its history. The band has found much success in Europe, with many of their singles charting in countries such as the Netherlands, United Kingdom, France and Spain. They are most successful in their native country Belgium, where they have 27 hit singles which have been in the Ultratop Chart, 22 of them being in the top ten and four of them being number ones. Furthermore, all of their seven albums have charted there, with two of them reaching number one. The band are the current record holders for the number of TMF Awards in Belgium and the Netherlands, with a total of 17 awards received.

In 2006, to celebrate their 10th anniversary, Milk Inc. decided to surprise fans with a two-hour live concert at the Sportpaleis Arena in Belgium. They performed many of their well-known hit songs as well as songs from the album Supersized.

Members

Current

Regi Penxten 

Regi was born on 4 March 1976 at Hasselt in Belgium. At the age of 12, he got his first computer connected to a synthesizer. This marks the beginning of his passion for music. He studied at the music academy to learn to read music and he also played the guitar from an early age.

Regi Penxten decided to make music his career after, at the age of 18, he released some Underground and Trance EP on the Dance Opera and Illusion Label. Despite this, his parents wanted him to have a good education, thus he studied Telecommunication Electronics in Belgium. Milk Inc's and Regi's hit success started with "La Vache" in 1996, which was a big hit successor.

The Milk Inc project was not enough for him, so he has more music projects ongoing with several singers and other producers. Regi's first solo album Registrated went gold before its release date. It is a compilation of various Belgian artists.

Linda Mertens 
Linda was born on 20 July 1978 in Wilrijk, Belgium. From her early years Linda dreamt of becoming a performing artist. She studied art and after high school spent two years studying hairdressing. In 2000 Linda went to a club with some friends where Regi was deejaying, whilst there she asked him if he needed a singer for any of his projects and was asked to audition. At the time she did not know that Regi was looking for a new singer for Milk Inc; she has been the lead singer for Milk Inc ever since. In 2017, her 2-year-old daughter Lio died due to cancer. Linda got shaken by this, will not sing until she feels like it and has no plans for it.

Former

Filip Vandueren 
Filip Vandueren was the last one that co-produced Milk Inc along with Regi Penxten and played keyboards in the band's full live shows and concerts in the past.

Vandueren worked as a producer under several artist names (including Philip Banks and Jedidiah Albertson). He started as a hard trance and underground producer on the DanceOpera Label. He has different projects to his name, such as K-Lab (known for Reunion — old school trance with a happy late-nineties feeling), The Klan, Karnak-X (Sky-Trance), Vidts and Vandueren with quality trance at the Oceanic Records label, and DJ Jan vs Vandueren with progressive and hard trance with remixes for Tiësto and DJ Esteem.

Ivo Donckers 
Co-founder and member from the start of the project Milk Inc until 2000. He was the most important member, and co-producer of this project. Studio technician at Antler Subway (EMI), he was responsible for many projects and remixes for 2Unlimited, Ace of Base, 2 Fabiola, etc. The gimmick in La Vache was a piece of vocal from a previous recording from Ivo Donckers & Sven Maes, pitched up.

Nikkie Van Lierop 
Born 7 March 1963 in Simmern, Germany, Anita Dominika Cornelia van Lierop, better known as Nikkie Van Lierop, and by her artist name "Jade 4U" and as a co-founder of Lords of Acid. In 1992, she had a UK Top 20 hit as the featured vocalist on Praga Khan's "Injected With A Poison" single (a double-A side with "Free Your Body"). Five years later, in the spring of 1997 Praga Khan produced a remix of the song "La Vache" for the band (then known as Milk Incorporated), with the song going on to become a Top 40 hit in the UK under the name of "Good Enough (La Vache)". In the music video "La Vache" that was filmed in England, Jade 4U can be seen. Since then the singer Nikkie along with Praga Khan contributed parts in lyrics and melody. After the resounding success of the songs she sang in the performances during the first tour of Milk Inc. in France, she left the band in order to concentrate on Praga Khan and Lords of Acid, which had gained a cult following in the United States.

Sofie Winters 
Sofie Winters was born 22 May 1976 in Leuven, Belgium. She replaced Van Lierop for a few months. During her time at Milk Inc, Winters was a singer in the song "Free Your Mind". Winters was then, and still is today, a model and actress.

Ann Vervoort 
Graphic designer Ann Vervoort (10 March 1977 – 22 April 2010) was a dancer for Pat Krimson before she joined Milk Inc. She was brought in by Regi Penxten in 1997 as a replacement for Sofie Winters as a singer for appearances. Karine Boelaerts, a Belgian studio singer, who was already working for other projects such as 2 Fabiola was hired to record all the songs.

In the middle of September 2000, Vervoort left Milk Inc and moved to Ibiza with her boyfriend Patrick Claesen (alias Pat Krimson) producer of 2Fabiola, Nunca and Leopold 3, where they founded the record label Beni Musa Records. Vervoort was replaced by Linda Mertens. On 22 April 2010, Vervoort was found dead at her house in Houthalen-Helchteren. According to the newspaper Het Laatste Nieuws, an amount of alcohol and drugs were involved.

John Miles Jnr. 
John Miles Jnr. is the son of the renowned musician John Miles. Miles studied pop music at Newcastle College and worked as a guitarist already known as "Popmusikern", with artists including Debbie Harry, Bryan Ferry, Joe Cocker and Andrea Bocelli. Miles co-wrote songs with Regi Penxten and Filip Vandueren when he became a group member in 1997 and performed as their guitarist on stage. The first single he was involved in making, "In My Eyes", was a commercial success. That was partly Miles' merit, his influence as a songwriter and the new style of the music effect he brought to the group. This in combination with the voice of Karine Boelaerts brought the music to a new level. All the songs he co-wrote were published during his time at Milk Inc. At the same time Vervoort stopped as playback, Miles wanted to leave Milk Inc. as well. He accompanied the group until the beginning of 2001. In 2002, the group had two top ten hits in the UK with "In My Eyes" (UK #9) and "Walk on Water" (UK #10). In the years 2006–2008, he rejoined Milk Inc. as a guitarist on their Supersized and Forever shows at the Antwerp Sportpaleis. He has since gone on to join another Belgian dance act, Sylver, co-produced by Regi Penxten.

Timeline

Discography

Albums

Singles

Filmography

Music videos

DVDs

Awards

References

External links 
 Official site
 Official forum
 Linda Mertens official site
 Regi Penxten official site
 Complete discography
 Milk Inc. at discogs.com

Musical groups established in 1996
Belgian trance music groups
Belgian Eurodance groups
Belgian techno music groups
Belgian house music groups
Dance Nations artists